Dr. Sun Yat-sen is an outdoor statue of Sun Yat-sen by Lu Chun-Hsiung and Michael Kang, installed in Manhattan's Columbus Park, in the U.S. state of New York.

References

External links
 Dr. Sun Yat-sen – New York, NY at Waymarking

Chinatown, Manhattan
Cultural depictions of Sun Yat-sen
Monuments and memorials in Manhattan
Outdoor sculptures in Manhattan
Sculptures of men in New York City
Statues in New York City